Man by the Wayside is a 1923 German silent drama film directed by William Dieterle and starring Alexander Granach, Emilia Unda and Dieterle.

It was Dieterle's first film as director, and featured Marlene Dietrich in a supporting role. Twenty years later he would direct her again the 1944 Hollywood film Kismet.

Cast
 Alexander Granach as Shoemaker
 Emilia Unda as Wife of the shoemaker
 William Dieterle as Michael
 Heinrich George as Gutsbesitzer
 Wilhelm Völcker as Kutscher
 Sophie Pagay as Krämersfrau
 Marlene Dietrich as Krämerstochter
 Wilhelm Diegelmann as Wirt
 Liselotte Rolle as Kind des Schusters
 Max Pohl as Amtmann
 Ludwig Rex as Aufseher
 Ernst Gronau as Arzt
 Fritz Rasp as Farmhand
 Werner Pledath as Knechte
 Dolly Lorenz as Magd
 Gerhard Bienert
 Georg Hilbert
 Fritz Kampers
 Hermine Körner
 Max Nemetz
 Lotte Stein

References

Bibliography
 Bock, Hans-Michael & Bergfelder, Tim. The Concise CineGraph. Encyclopedia of German Cinema. Berghahn Books, 2009.

External links

1923 films
Films of the Weimar Republic
German silent feature films
Films directed by William Dieterle
Films based on works by Leo Tolstoy
German black-and-white films
German drama films
1923 drama films
1923 directorial debut films
1920s German-language films
Silent drama films
1920s German films